Patrick Descamps (born 13 December 1956) is a Belgian actor and stage director.

Theater

Filmography

Dubbing

External links 
 

1956 births
Living people
People from Mons
20th-century Belgian male actors
21st-century Belgian male actors
Belgian male film actors
Belgian male television actors
Belgian male stage actors
Belgian theatre directors